Curt Clausen (born October 9, 1967) is an American race walker.  He placed 4th 50 km event in the 1999 IAAF World Championships in Athletics, but after 2 years was later awarded the 3rd place bronze medal, after the winner was stripped of his title for a doping violation.

Personal bests
 20 km: 1:23:34 hrs –  Eugene, Oregon, June 27, 1999
 50 km: 3:48:04 hrs –  Mézidon-Canon, May 2, 1999

Achievements

References
 Curt Clausen at USATF
 
 trackfield.brinkster

External links
 
 
 Tilastopaja biography

1967 births
Living people
American male racewalkers
Athletes (track and field) at the 1996 Summer Olympics
Athletes (track and field) at the 2000 Summer Olympics
Athletes (track and field) at the 2004 Summer Olympics
Athletes (track and field) at the 1999 Pan American Games
Olympic track and field athletes of the United States
World Athletics Championships medalists
Sportspeople from Trenton, New Jersey
Track and field athletes from New Jersey
Pan American Games track and field athletes for the United States